The Atlantic Spanish mackerel (Scomberomorus maculatus) is a migratory species of mackerel that swims to the northern Gulf of Mexico in spring, returns to southern Florida in the eastern Gulf, and to Mexico in the western Gulf in the fall.

Description
The fish exhibits a green back; its sides are silvery marked with about three rows of round to elliptical yellow spots. Lateral line gradually curving down from the upper end of the gill cover toward caudal peduncle. The first (spiny) dorsal fin is black at the front. Posterior membranes are white with a black edge.  Its single row of cutting edged teeth in each jaw (around sixty-four teeth in all) are large, uniform, closely spaced and flattened from side to side. As with the King mackerel and the Cero mackerel, these teeth look very similar to those of the Bluefish, Pomatomus saltatrix. Spanish Mackerel can grow (rarely) to 36-37 inches and weigh up to 14 pounds.

Distribution/habitat
Spanish mackerel occur seasonally from the Yucatán peninsula, Mexico, as far north as Cape Cod, Massachusetts.

Migration patterns
It appears that one Atlantic and one or more Gulf groups of Spanish mackerel occur in Florida waters. With rising water temperatures, the Atlantic group migrates along the Atlantic coast of the United States from Miami, Florida, beginning in late February through July reaching as far as southern Cape Cod, Massachusetts, then returning in fall. An Eastern Gulf group moves northward from the Florida Keys during late winter and spring, appearing off the central West Coast of Florida about April 1. Movement continues westward and terminates along the northern Texas coast. During fall, this group migrates back to its wintering grounds in the Keys.

Life history
The Gulf group of Spanish mackerel spawn in batches from May to September off shore of Texas, off the Gulf shore of Florida as early as April in some years. The Atlantic group spawns starting in April off the Carolinas and from late August to late September in the northernmost part of its range. Females live longer and grow to larger sizes than males. Males reach about age-6 and  FL.

Feeding habits
Spanish mackerel are carnivores. As with other members of the genus, food consists mainly of small fishes with lesser quantities of shrimp and squid. Striped anchovies (Engraulidae) and clupeoids such as menhaden, alewives and thread herring (Opisthonema), are particularly important forage in North Carolina, Florida, Texas, and Veracruz.  The percentage of anchovies consumed is higher for juveniles than for adults.

Fisheries

Fishing gear and methods
Spanish mackerel are a highly valued fish throughout their range from North Carolina to Texas. Recreational anglers catch Spanish mackerel from boats while trolling or drifting and from boats, piers, jetties, and beaches by casting spoons and jigs and live-bait fishing.  Fast lure retrieves are key to catching these quick fish.  Commercial methods are primarily run-around gill netting, and rarely, by trolling lures similar to those used by recreational anglers.

On November 4, 1987, Woody Outlaw caught a world-record 13 pound Spanish mackerel on a blue and white Sea Witch with a strip of fastback menhaden on a 7/0 hook, held by a Shimano bait-casting reel on a Kuna rod with 30-pound test line.

Management
Spanish mackerel are managed in commercial and recreation fisheries with bag limits, size limits, commercial trip limits, and with only seasonal fishing allowed. The management of mackerel has been considered a success because the population used to be in decline, but is now on the rise without overfishing occurring.

As food
Spanish mackerel are primarily marketed fresh or frozen as fillets as commercially caught fish are too small to sell in the form of steaks. Their raw flesh is white. They may be prepared by broiling, frying, baking or, rarely, by smoking.

The Spanish mackerel is also a popular sushi fish. By analogy with the Japanese Spanish mackerel, which is a member of the same genus, it is often called sawara on sushi menus.

Similar species
Spanish mackerel are similar in appearance to small King mackerel (Scomberomorus cavalla) and Cero mackerel (Scomberomorus regalis). All three are very similar in shape and coloration. They may be distinguished as follows:

The lateral line on Spanish and Cero mackerel slopes gradually from the top edge of the gill to the tail. In contrast that of the king mackerel takes an abrupt drop at mid-body.

The first (spiny) dorsal on Spanish and Cero mackerel has a prominent black patch. The King mackerel has none. As all three species normally keep the first dorsal folded back in a body groove, this difference is not immediately evident.

Spanish mackerel have prominent yellow spots on the flanks at all sizes. In addition to such spots, Cero mackerel have one or more yellow stripes along the centerline.

Worldwide, there are many members of this genus quite similar to one or another of these three species. In particular, off Mexico, Atlantic Spanish mackerel may be confused with Serra Spanish mackerel (Scomberomorus brasiliensis) which may appear in the same area.

See also
 Atlantic mackerel (Scomber scombrus)

References

External links
 

Atlantic Spanish mackerel
Commercial fish
Sport fish
Fish of the Western Atlantic
Fish of the Eastern United States
Fish of the Gulf of Mexico
Taxa named by Samuel L. Mitchill
Atlantic Spanish mackerel